Shout It Out is the debut studio album by German recording artist Elli Erl. It was released by BMG in association with 19 Recordings and Hansa Records on October 4, 2004 in German-speaking Europe, following her participation in the second season of Deutschland sucht den Superstar, which she won. While she was offered to record a full album with DSDS judge and producer Dieter Bohlen, Erl declined in favor of different collaborators, citing his pop sound and lyrical approach. Instead, musician Frabo was consulted to work on the majority of pop rock–driven Shout It Out, along with songwriters Rea Garvey, Guy Chambers, and Erl herself.

The album received mixed reviews from critics, with laut.de praising Erl's vocals and the laid-back attitude of the album but criticizing the overall production of the songs. A moderate commercial success, it debuted and peaked at number 33 on the German Albums Chart but failed to chart in Austria and Switzerland. Shout It Out was preceded by the top ten single "This Is My Life" and produced two further singles, including the top forty entry "In My Dream." However, lackluster sales resulted into the termination of Erl's recording contract in 2005. As of 2018, Shout It Out remains the lowest-peaking debut album by any DSDS winner.

Track listing 
Credits adapted from the liner notes of Shout It Out.

Charts

References

2004 debut albums
Hansa Records albums